Agonopterix rotundella is a moth of the family Depressariidae and is found in most of Europe. It was first described from moths found in Surrey, England by the entomologist John Douglas in 1846.

Life cycle

Imago
The wingspan is 14–17 mm. The forewings are rather narrow, pale greyish-ochreous, sometimes somewhat fuscous sprinkled posteriorly; subbasal mark of dorsum reduced to a dark fuscous dot; first discal stigma absent, a black dot obliquely before and above its usual position, second black dark fuscous terminal dots, sometimes indistinct. Hindwings whitish-grey, darker terminally. The larva is green; dorsal and subdorsal lines darker; head and plate of 2 black

Adults are on wing from September to May, overwintering as an adult.

Eggs
In Great Britain and Ireland, eggs are laid on the leaves of wild carrot (Daucus carota) during May. Elsewhere in Europe eggs are also laid on Laserpitium gallicum and Distichoselinum tenuifolium.

Larva
Larva can be found from June to August. Initially they mine the leaves of their host plant in the form of a small, irregular full depth corridor. Older larvae vacate their mines and continue feeding in a folded leaf, sewn with white silk. The silk can often be seen at the edge of the habitation. Early instars are a dull yellowish green with a black head. On the later instars the body is apple green with dark greyish green lines and a black head.

Similar species
The intermediate and later instars of [[Agonopterix ciliella|A. ciliella]] feed on a variety of umbelliferous plants; larvae of this species and A. rotundella'' should be reared to confirm the identification.

Pupa
Found in the soil or amongst detritus.

Distribution
The moth is found in most of Europe, except Fennoscandia and most of the Balkan Peninsula.  In Britain, although the type species was found inland it is now confined to coasts. Also found in Iran and Turkey.

References

External links
 
 British Lepidoptera

Agonopterix
Moths described in 1846
Moths of Asia
Moths of Europe
Taxa named by John William Douglas